Arun Prakash is an Indian educational facility planner. He is the receiver of the National Award for Best Principal from the President of India, Dr. A. P. J. Abdul Kalam.

He has been at the helm of affairs of various institutions for more than 25 years. He is an alumnus of Allahabad University where he also began teaching chemistry, following his stint at Allahabad, he then joined the Delhi Public School Society to lead five of the Delhi Public Schools in India and abroad. Arun is the founding principal of Sai International School, Bhubaneswar, and four Delhi Public Schools (DPS Bongaigaon; Guwahati; Bilaspur; and Jeddah, Saudi Arabia), besides being the principal at DPS Korba. Currently, he is the Founder and Principal of Laurels International School, Allahabad, the first international Day Boarding School of Allahabad He is also the Chief Mentor of Lal Bahadur Shastri International School Jaipur.

Arun perceive the plan for Pathway International School in Dubai. He is the founding chairman of Laurels India, an associate of Laurels Global, based in the United Kingdom. He is a member of the National College for School Leadership in the UK, as well as many other international organizations.

References

http://www.laurelsinternationalschool.com/
http://www.laurelsinternationalschool.com/images/press/lis-media-2.jpg
http://www.laurelsinternationalschool.com/images/press/lis-media-1.jpg
http://www.jagran.com/uttar-pradesh/allahabad-city-11956140.html

Year of birth missing (living people)
Living people
Educators from Chhattisgarh
Heads of schools in India